Astelia neocaledonica is a  rhizomatous tufted perennial that is endemic to New Caledonia. The species produces clusters of mauve berries between October and November in the species native range.

References

Asteliaceae
Endemic flora of New Caledonia
Plants described in 1906